The Kingsport–Bristol–Bristol, Tennessee-Virginia Metropolitan Statistical Area is a Metropolitan Statistical Area (MSA) in Northeast Tennessee and Southwest Virginia as defined by the United States Office of Management and Budget (OMB). It was formed in December 2003 by the merger of the Bristol, VA MSA and Kingsport-Bristol, TN-VA MSA.

As of the 2000 census, the MSA had a population of 298,494 (though a July 1, 2009 estimate placed the population at 305,629).

MSA components
Four counties (two in Tennessee; two in Virginia) and one independent city are included in the Kingsport–Bristol–Bristol, TN-VA Metropolitan Statistical Area.

Tennessee
Hawkins County
Sullivan County

Virginia
Note: Since a state constitutional change in 1871, all cities in Virginia are independent cities that are not located in any county. The OMB considers these independent cities to be county-equivalents for the purpose of defining MSAs in Virginia.
Scott County
Washington County 
City of Bristol (Independent City)

Communities

Places with more than 50,000 inhabitants
Kingsport, Tennessee (principal city)
Johnson City, Tennessee (partial)

Places with 10,000 to 40,000 inhabitants
Bristol, Tennessee (principal city)
Bristol, Virginia (principal city)
Bloomingdale, Tennessee (census-designated place)

Places with 1,000 to 10,000 inhabitants

Places with less than 1,000 inhabitants
Bulls Gap, Tennessee
Damascus, Virginia
Clinchport, Virginia
Duffield, Virginia
Dungannon, Virginia
Nickelsville, Virginia

Unincorporated places

Demographics
As of the census of 2000, there were 298,484 people, 124,021 households, and 87,501 families residing within the MSA. The racial makeup of the MSA was 96.77% White, 1.84% African American, 0.19% Native American, 0.33% Asian, 0.02% Pacific Islander, 0.19% from other races, and 0.66% from two or more races. Hispanic or Latino of any race were 0.70% of the population.

The median income for a household in the MSA was $30,460, and the median income for a family was $37,235. Males had a median income of $29,803 versus $21,312 for females. The per capita income for the MSA was $17,202.

Combined Statistical Area

The Johnson City–Kingsport–Bristol Combined Statistical Area (CSA) is made up of five counties in Northeastern Tennessee as well as two counties and an independent city in Southwestern Virginia. The statistical area includes two metropolitan areas. As of the 2000 Census, the CSA had a population of 480,091 (though a July 1, 2007 estimate placed the population at 497,240).

Components
Metropolitan Statistical Areas (MSAs)
Johnson City (Carter County, TN; Unicoi County, TN; Washington County, TN)
Kingsport–Bristol–Bristol (Hawkins County, TN; Sullivan County, TN; Scott County, VA; Washington County, VA; City of Bristol, VA)

See also
List of U.S. Metropolitan Statistical Areas (MSA) in Virginia
Virginia census statistical areas

References

 
Geography of Sullivan County, Tennessee
Geography of Hawkins County, Tennessee
Geography of Scott County, Virginia
Geography of Washington County, Virginia
Bristol, Virginia